Fire!! was an African-American literary magazine published in New York City in 1926 during the Harlem Renaissance. The publication was started by Wallace Thurman, Zora Neale Hurston, Aaron Douglas, John P. Davis, Richard Bruce Nugent, Gwendolyn Bennett, Lewis Grandison Alexander, Countee Cullen, and Langston Hughes. 
The magazine's title referred to burning up old ideas, and Fire!! challenged the norms of the older Black generation while featuring younger authors. The publishers promoted a realistic style, with vernacular language and controversial topics such as homosexuality and prostitution. Many readers were offended, and some Black leaders denounced the magazine.   
The endeavor was plagued by debt, and its quarters burned down, ending the magazine after just one issue.

History 
Fire!! was conceived to express the African-American experience during the Harlem Renaissance in a modern and realistic fashion, using literature as a vehicle of enlightenment. The magazine's founders wanted to express the changing attitudes of younger African Americans. In Fire!! they explored controversial issues in the Black community, such as homosexuality, bisexuality, interracial relationships, promiscuity, prostitution, and color prejudice.

Langston Hughes wrote that the name was intended to symbolize their goal "to burn up a lot of the old, dead conventional Negro-white ideas of the past ... into a realization of the existence of the younger Negro writers and artists, and provide us with an outlet for publication not available in the limited pages of the small Negro magazines then existing." The magazine's headquarters burned to the ground shortly after it published its first issue, ending its operations.

Reception 
Fire!! was plagued by debt and encountered poor sales. It was not well received by the Black public because some felt that the journal did not represent the sophisticated self-image of Blacks in Harlem. Other readers found it offensive for many reasons, and it was denounced by Black leaders such as the Talented Tenth, "who viewed the effort as decadent and vulgar". They disapproved of content relating to prostitution and homosexuality, which they considered degrading to "the race." They also thought many pieces published were a throw-back to old stereotypes, as they were written in the slang and language of the southern vernacular. They felt the "undignified" contents reflected poorly on the Black race. As an example, the critic at the Baltimore Afro-American wrote that he "just tossed the first issue of Fire!! into the fire".

But, The Bookman applauded the journal's unique qualities and its personality. Although this magazine had only one issue, "this single issue of Fire!! is considered an event of historical importance."

Features 
The magazine covered a variety of literary genres: it includes a novella, an essay, stories, plays, drawings and illustrations, and poetry.

Representation in other media 
The story of the rise and fall of Fire!! is showcased in the 2004 movie Brother to Brother. It features a gay African-American college student named Perry Williams. he befriends an elderly gay African American named Bruce Nugent. Williams learns that Nugent was a writer and co-founder of Fire!!, and associated with other notable writers and artists of the Harlem Renaissance.

References

External links

Fire Press: Publisher of reproductions of Fire!!

Magazines established in 1926
Magazines disestablished in 1926
African-American literature
African-American magazines
Defunct literary magazines published in the United States
Harlem Renaissance
Poetry magazines published in the United States
Magazines published in New York City